KONA-LP (100.5 FM, "KONA LPFM 1005") is a radio station licensed to serve the community of Kailua-Kona, Hawaii. The station is owned by The Sanctuary of Mana Ke'a Gardens dba Radio Alchemy. It airs a community radio format.

The station was assigned the KONA-LP call letters by the Federal Communications Commission on April 17, 2014.

References

External links
 Official Website
 FCC Public Inspection File for KONA-LP
 

ONA-LP
ONA-LP
Radio stations established in 2017
2017 establishments in Hawaii
Community radio stations in the United States
Hawaii County, Hawaii